Nayee Padosan (English: New Neighbour) is a 2003 Hindi-language romantic comedy film directed by cinematographer B. H. Tharun Kumar in his debut and produced by Nitin Manmohan, starring Mahek Chahal, Vikas Kalantri, Anuj Sawhney and Aslam Khan in the lead roles. The film is partially inspired by the Tamil film Indru Poi Naalai Vaa and Chashme Buddoor, and was a moderate success at the box office. The film was also the Bollywood debut of Mahek Chahal.

Plot
Raju is an unemployed MBA graduate from a simple Gujarati family who spends his time playing cricket with the young kids in the colony where he lives. One fine day, he finds a neighbour in Pooja Iyengar, who he falls in love with.

Raja is an aspiring rockstar who despises classical music. During a college fest, he has a confrontation with Pooja, but ends up losing both the confrontation and his heart to her. Ram is an aspiring actor who moved from rural Punjab to become a big actor in Mumbai. He too falls for Pooja after an encounter with her.

Later, Raja and Ram shift to the colony where Pooja lives, ultimately crossing paths with Raju in the process. All three of them make a pact to compete for Pooja's hand in marriage by trying to impress her. However, the entry of Pooja's childhood friend Prabhu, who is a favourite with the Iyengars, pushes the trio to a setback, but it only fuels their aspirations.

The film goes through various emotional graphs where the three boys have their individual shares of gains and losses vis-a-vis their competitors. The girl doesn't reveal her feelings until a certain change of events makes her realize whom she really loves and would want to spend the rest of her life with.

Cast
 Mahek Chahal as Pooja Iyengar
 Anuj Sawhney as Raju
 Vikas Kalantri as Ram
 Aslam Khan as Raja
 Rahul Bhat in dual roles as Prabhu and the gangster acting as Prabhu's clone
 Vijay Kashyap as Keshav Iyengar (Pooja's father)
 Yusuf Hussain as Mr. Venkatesh Iyengar (Pooja's grandfather)
 Shabnam Kapoor as Gayatri Iyengar (Pooja's mother)

Music 

The soundtrack contains 7 songs composed by the award-winning trio Shankar–Ehsaan–Loy. Lyrics were by Sameer.

References

External links 
 
 

2000s Hindi-language films
2003 films
Films scored by Shankar–Ehsaan–Loy
2003 romantic comedy films
Indian romantic comedy films
Films scored by Surinder Sodhi
2003 directorial debut films